The Division of Lang was an Australian Electoral Division in the state of New South Wales. It was located in the southern suburbs of Sydney, and was named after Rev. John Dunmore Lang, a Member of the New South Wales Legislative Assembly and advocate of Australian independence. It originally included the suburbs of Kogarah and Marrickville, but by the time it was abolished in 1977, it covered the suburbs of Lakemba and Belmore.  The Division was proclaimed in 1900, and was one of the original 75 divisions to be contested at the first Federal election.  It was held by the Labor Party for all but one term after 1928, and in its final form was very safe for that party.  It was abolished at the redistribution of 31 October 1977.

Members

Election results

References

1901 establishments in Australia
Constituencies established in 1901
1977 disestablishments in Australia
Constituencies disestablished in 1977
Lang